Christopher Phiri (born 26 May 1975) is a Zimbabwean former List A cricketer. He is now an umpire and stood in a tour match between Zimbabwe Chairman's XI and Afghanistan in October 2015. On 22 July 2021, he stood in his first Twenty20 International (T20I) match, between Zimbabwe and Bangladesh. On 10 August 2022, he stood in his first One Day International (ODI) match, between Zimbabwe and Bangladesh.

See also
 List of Twenty20 International cricket umpires

References

External links
 

1975 births
Living people
Zimbabwean cricketers
Zimbabwean cricket umpires
Zimbabwean Twenty20 International cricket umpires
Zimbabwean One Day International cricket umpires
Sportspeople from Bulawayo
Westerns (Zimbabwe) cricketers